Shuto or variants may refer to:

A knifehand strike, known in Japanese as shutō-uchi
Shutō (seafood), Japanese tuna liver seafood pickle
Shuto Expressway (首都高速道路, Shuto Kōsoku-dōro) network of toll expressways
Šuto Orizari Municipality (Macedonian: Шуто Оризари) municipality
Shuuto, long "shootball" pitch in Japanese baseball

People with the name
, Japanese footballer
Shuto Ando (1994) Japanese basketball player
Shuto Inaba (1990) Japanese footballer
Shuto Kawai (1993) Japanese footballer
Shuto Kono (1993) Japanese footballer
Shuto Machino (1999) Japanese footballer
, Japanese professional baseball player
Shuto Yamamoto (1985) Japanese footballer
, Japanese professional baseball player

Japanese masculine given names